Karoi is a town in Zimbabwe.

Location
Karoi is located in Karoi District, Mashonaland West Province, in central northern Zimbabwe. The coordinates of Karoi are: 16° 48' 36.00"S, 29° 42' 0.00"E (Latitude:16.8100; Longitude:29.7000).

Overview
In addition to the offices of Karoi Town Council, the town is also the location of the headquarters of Karoi District Administration. The surrounding countryside is farmland, where tobacco is the primary cash crop. In 2011, the Tobacco Industry and Marketing Board (TIMB) permitted Mashonaland Tobacco Company (MTC) to open auction floors and buy tobacco in the town, but controversy arose in 2012 about purchases from uncontracted farmers.

The main secondary schools in Karoi are Karoi High School and Chikangwe High School.

History
The name Karoi means "little witch".

Population
During the 1992 national census, the population of the town of Karoi was estimated at 14,763. In 2004, the population estimate was 25,030.

Climate

See also
 Kariba Dam
 Lake Kariba
 List of power stations in Zimbabwe

References

Populated places in Mashonaland West Province
Karoi District